The 1994 Waveney District Council election took place on 5 May 1994 to elect members of Waveney District Council in England. This was on the same day as other local elections.

Summary

Ward results

Beccles Town

Carlton

Gunton

Harbour

Kessingland

Kirkley

Lothingland

Mutford

Normanston

Oulton Broad

Pakefield

South Elmham

Southwold

St. Margaret's

Wainford

Whitton

References

1994 English local elections
May 1994 events in the United Kingdom
1994
1990s in Suffolk